Alice Lau Kiong Yieng (born 30 July 1981) is a Malaysian politician and pharmacist who has served as the Deputy Speaker of the Dewan Rakyat II under Speaker Johari Abdul since December 2022 and the Member of Parliament (MP) for Lanang since May 2013. She served as Chairperson of the National Institute of Occupational Safety and Health (NIOSH) from October 2019 to March 2020. She is a member of the Democratic Action Party (DAP), a component party of the Pakatan Harapan (PH) coalition.

Education 
A pharmacist by profession, Lau received her Master of Pharmacy (MPharm) from University of Strathclyde.

Political career 
A native of Sibu, Lau first contested for the Bawang Assan seat in the Sarawak State Assembly during the 2011 Sarawak state election, but was defeated by six-term incumbent Member of Legislative Assembly (MLA) Wong Soon Koh.

In the 2013 Malaysian general election, Lau was nominated by the DAP to contest for Lanang in Sibu. She defeated five-term incumbent Tiong Thai King with a majority of 8,630 votes, or 19.2% of the votes, becoming the first female opposition MP elected from Sarawak.

Lau successfully defended her Lanang parliamentary seat during the historic 2018 Malaysian general election with an increased majority over candidates from the Sarawak United Peoples' Party (SUPP) and Justices of Peace Coalition People's Party (PEACE).

In July 2019, Alice Lau had asked in parliament on what actions the federal government would take against those who called for secession of Sarawak from Malaysia and if the secession is permissible by the Malaysian federal constitution and 1963 Malaysian agreement. Sarawak United Peoples' Party (SUPP) then accused her of betraying the interests of Sarawakians. Alice Lau defended that she was merely raising the question on the legality Sarawak being seceded from Malaysia.

In October 2019, Lau was appointed as chairperson of the board of directors of the Malaysian National Institute of Occupational Safety and Health (NIOSH) succeeding Lee Lam Thye who had served in the capacity for 25 years. Her tenure was terminated by the end of March 2020 following events of the 2020 Malaysian political crisis which saw the Alliance of Hope (PH) coalition losing its grip on power.

In July 2021, Alice distributed food aid to 1,540 families in the Lanang constituency during the Covid-19 pandemic.

Election results

Personal life 
Lau's father, Lau Cheng Kiong, was the chairman of Pelawan branch of the Sarawak Progressive Democratic Party (SPDP), a component of the National Front (BN) government coalition.

Lau is married to a businessman from Malacca, Loo Chee Wee. The couple have a son who was born on 9 April 2016.

On 27 May 2021, it was reported that she had tested positive for COVID-19 and undergoing quarantine at a Ministry of Health (KKM) centre in Sibu.

See also 

 Lanang (federal constituency)

References 

Living people
1981 births
People from Sarawak
Malaysian pharmacists
Malaysian politicians of Chinese descent
Democratic Action Party (Malaysia) politicians
Members of the Dewan Rakyat
Women members of the Dewan Rakyat
Women in Sarawak politics
Women pharmacists
21st-century Malaysian politicians
21st-century Malaysian women politicians